Ulisses dos Santos (13 May 1929 – 17 March 2021) was a Brazilian hurdler. He competed in the men's 400 metres hurdles at the 1956 Summer Olympics.

References

External links

1929 births
2021 deaths
Athletes (track and field) at the 1956 Summer Olympics
Brazilian male hurdlers
Olympic athletes of Brazil
Sportspeople from Alagoas